Deadly Messages is a 1985 made-for-TV horror mystery thriller film directed by Jack Bender.

Plot 

After Laura Daniels, who works at a dating consulting firm, leaves to go out on a date with lawyer Michael Krasnick, her roommate Cindy Matthews uses Laura's newly found Ouija board and gets in touch with 21-year-old David, who claims to have been murdered in the New York apartment in 1978. The same evening, Laura arrives home, witnessing a mysterious man strangling Cindy to death. As soon as the police arrive, Cindy's body and all traces of any crime are missing, causing the police to feel pranked; filing her for violation. Matthew believes Laura, though thinks that Cindy is pranking with her; assuring Laura that Cindy has a past of suddenly disappearing for a long period of time. Laura does not feel extremely save though, and purchases an alarm for protection in a mall, in which she gets eventually chased by Cindy's murderer.

That evening, Laura uses the Ouija board and comes in contact with Mark, who claims to have murdered Cindy and announces that he is going to kill her as well because she witnessed it. Laura faints and visits a doctor the next day for a brain scan; there she receives prescription drugs. Next, she is fired from her job, because her boss claims that her resume is one big lie; Laura, however, insists that all the references are true. Feeling betrayed by her boss, Laura goes to swim off her anger, but feels that she is yet again attacked by her murderer in the pool. While seeking consolation with her boyfriend, Laura's doctor reveals to Michael that, in the past, Laura has been subject to electroshock therapy and may have schizophrenia or a depression. Despite feeling disappointed that Laura has kept this from him, Michael decides to confront her, though Laura denies Dr. Kelton's claims.

Shortly after, Michael finds out that most of Laura's claims about her life are also featured in a series of children's books written by someone named Laura Brooks. Upon another confrontation, Laura admits that she might be insane, but Michael believes that she is a compulsive liar and leaves her. Laura, feeling lost, turns to the Ouija board and later finds out that "Mark" was murdered in her apartment by arson. Simultaneously, Cindy's murderer begins to attack Laura in her apartment with an axe. Laura calls for the police, but they do not believe her stories anymore. Instead, she hides in the closet before running for her life, again escaping from him. A visit to the police station does not help her, prompting her to investigate Mark's death herself: she finds out that Mark's sister Jennifer is a mental patient.

Visiting her in a mental hospital proves shocking, as the staff recognize her as Jennifer. Nurse Crenshaw explains to her that she escaped from the institution over a year ago, following an attack by a man who appears to be the same man trying to kill her currently. She also finds the children's books Michael found in the hospital library, thus explaining why she assumed the main character's identity after her escape. Having some answers, Laura heads back to New York, only to stumble in Michael, who apologizes to her and admits that he wants her back. Together, they check into a motel, where - after Michael has left for pizza - the murderer attacks Michael in his car and stabs him in the leg, before going to the motel and attacking Laura. She is able to hit him on the head with a lamp and then runs off. He chases her, and as he is about to stab her, Michael shoots him to death. Laura recognizes him as her brother and bursts out in tears. Remembering everything now, she explains that the person killed in her apartment was her boyfriend David, not Mark. Mark killed David because he knew that his father did not approve of him, and then set the house on fire, hoping that Laura would die as well. Laura escaped, but the trauma caused her to lose her memory The reason why he came back years later to attempt to kill her again was because the Ouija board subconsciously helped her regain her memory. But as Michael points out, this doesn't explain the messages that Cindy (whose body was found in the trunk of Mark's car in another town) received while using the board alone.

The hotel owners later discover the Ouija board that Laura left behind. The power then goes out due to a storm and they hear a noise. Startled, the man shouts out asking if anyone is there. The pointer then moves by itself to point at Yes.

Cast
Kathleen Beller as Laura Daniels
Michael Brandon as Michael Krasnick
Dennis Franz as Detective Max Lucas
Scott Paulin as Dr. Roger Kelton
Elizabeth Huddle as Nurse Irma Crenshaw
Charles Tyner as George Clark
George Wyner
Raye Birk as Harding
Kurtwood Smith as Lieutenant Burton
Sherri Stoner as Cindy Matthews
Joseph G. Medalis as Kenneth Blatt
Barbara Collentine as Loretta Clark
Dennis Redfield as Dick Pizza
Michael Cassidy as Mark Banning
Troy Evans as Jessup

Production
According to lead actress Kathleen Beller, the film differed from her earlier thrillers - such as Are You in the House Alone? (1978) and No Place to Hide (1981) - by "[not taking] itself too seriously". In an interview, she explained her tendency to portray victims in films is encouraged by her "the color and size of [her] big brown eyes", "the way [she interprets] roles" and "the episodic roles [she] did while [she] was growing up". Her casting in the film was an unusual one: according to the actress, she received a call from her agent about a script, read it immediately, and drove to the studio an hour later, expecting a meeting. However, when she arrived, she was asked if she could start working right away. She took the role because of "the whirlwind casting", and the fact that she had not worked for seven months, since a guest spot on Glitter.

Reception
The New York Times criticized the film by claiming that the makers found the premise "amusing" and did not have "faith in the project", which, according to the review, showed on film.

References

External links

1985 television films
1985 films
1985 thriller films
ABC network original films
Films set in New York City
Films directed by Jack Bender
Films scored by Brad Fiedel
American horror television films
1980s English-language films
1980s American films